Hakob Sahak Hovakimyan better known as Hrayr Hovakimyan is a famous Armenian doctor, cardiac surgeon, National Hero of Armenia.

Education 

 1997 Graduated from the Medical Faculty of the University of Aleppo
 1977-1984 retrained at Beckman University in New York
 1984-1988 retrained at Providence St. Vincent Medical Center in Oregon (cardiopulmonary surgery direction)
 1988-1989 retrained at Children's Hospital of Philadelphia

Career 
 In 1990 he participated in the creation of the "Biotronic EDP-30" pulse generator
 1992-1993 worked at the Mickaelyan Institute of Surgery in Yerevan
 In 1993, he founded the Department of Pediatric Cardiac Surgery at the "Nork-Marash" Medical Center
 In 1996, a department of cardiac surgery for adults was also opened
 Chief Cardiac Surgeon of the Nork-Marash Medical Center
 Trained a large number of Armenian doctors in the field of cardiac surgery

Awards and honours  
 Honorary Citizen of Yerevan (1997)
 Honorary Doctor of the National Academy of Sciences of Armenia (1999)
 Member of associations of a number of foreign medical companies
 1st Place in Respiratory Surgery, Oregon Medical University.
 Order of Saint Mesrop Mashtots (2008)
 Medal of the II degree "For Services to the Fatherland" (Armenia) (2014)
 The title of the National Hero of Armenia, awarded the Order of the Fatherland (2020) - for many years of selfless work to save many lives

References 

Armenian surgeons
National Hero of Armenia
Year of birth missing (living people)